Guntheria is a genus of mites in the family Trombiculidae. The species of this genus are found in Australia and the islands to its north. 

The genus was first described by Herbert Womersley in 1939.

Species
The Australian Faunal Directory lists the following as valid:

 Guntheria agnewi (Domrow, 1964)
 Guntheria alpina (Domrow, 1964)
 Guntheria andromeda (Womersley, 1954)
 Guntheria antipodianum (Hirst, 1929)
 Guntheria arguri (Goff, 1979)
 Guntheria bamaga Domrow, 1978
 Guntheria cassiope (Womersley, 1952)
 Guntheria coorongensis (Hirst, 1929)
 Guntheria daniae Domrow, 1971
 Guntheria dasycerci (Hirst, 1929)
 Guntheria derricki (Womersley, 1939)
 Guntheria domrowi (Brennan, 1965)
 Guntheria dumosa (Womersley, 1952)
 Guntheria echymipera (Womersley & Kohls, 1947)
 Guntheria falx Domrow, 1971
 Guntheria heaslipi (Womersley & Heaslip, 1943)
 Guntheria innisfailensis (Womersley & Heaslip, 1943)
 Guntheria insueta Lester, 1984
 Guntheria kallipygos (Gunther, 1939)
 Guntheria kethleyi Goff, 1979
 Guntheria kowanyama Domrow, 1978
 Guntheria lappacea (Womersley, 1952)
 Guntheria mackerrasae (Womersley, 1952)
 Guntheria megale Domrow, 1972
 Guntheria miles Domrow, 1978
 Guntheria napierensis (Goff, 1979)
 Guntheria newmani (Womersley, 1952)
 Guntheria pannosa (Domrow, 1960)
 Guntheria parana (Womersley, 1944)
 Guntheria parva (Womersley, 1954)
 Guntheria perameles (Womersley, 1939)
 Guntheria peregrina (Womersley, 1952)
 Guntheria pertinax Domrow, 1972
 Guntheria petrogale (Womersley, 1934)
 Guntheria petulans (Domrow, 1960)
 Guntheria philippensis (Philip & Woodward, 1946)
 Guntheria platalea Domrow, 1984
 Guntheria pseudomys (Womersley, 1952)
 Guntheria quatuor Domrow, 1972
 Guntheria queenslandica (Womersley, 1939)
 Guntheria raui (Womersley, 1952)
 Guntheria salmleni Domrow, 1984
 Guntheria scaevola (Domrow, 1960)
 Guntheria shareli Domrow, 1984
 Guntheria shieldsi (Gunther, 1941)
 Guntheria smithi (Womersley, 1939)
 Guntheria sphinx Domrow, 1972
 Guntheria taylorae (Domrow, 1962)
 Guntheria tessares Domrow, 1971
 Guntheria tindalei (Womersley, 1936)
 Guntheria translucens (Womersley, 1944)
 Guntheria trichosuri (Womersley, 1939)
 Guntheria vegrandis Domrow, 1974
 Guntheria wongabelensis (Womersley, 1952)

References

Trombiculidae
Taxa described in 1839
Arachnids of Australia